Kwai Hing Estate is a public housing estate in Kwai Hing, Kwai Chung, New Territories, Hong Kong. It was built in the valley of Gin Drinkers Bay, later the town centre of Kwai Chung. Kwai Hing station is named after the name of the estate. It comprises 4 buildings with a total of 400 rental units (TPS units excluded) and 1 shopping arcade.

Kwai Chun Court is a Home Ownership Scheme court in Kwai Chung, near Kwai Hing Estate. It has 3 blocks built in 1995.

Background
Before redevelopment, it consisted of 5 buildings which were completed between 1970 and 1972. In 1985, the Housing Authority announced that the strength of the concrete in blocks 3, 4 and 5 of Kwai Hing Estate were below standard. All the blocks were later demolished between 1988 and 1992 to cope with the estate redevelopment. The estate was later redeveloped with 5 buildings between 1991 and 1992. The estate joined the Tenants Purchase Scheme (TPS) in 2002 and is currently managed by the Owners' Corporation.

Houses

Kwai Hing Estate

Kwai Chun Court

Demographics
According to the 2016 by-census, Kwai Hing Estate had a population of 3,908 while Kwai Chun Court had a population of 3,045. Altogether the population amounts to 6,953.

Politics
Kwai Hing Estate and Kwai Chun Court are located in Kwai Hing constituency of the Kwai Tsing District Council. It is currently represented by Leung Chi-shing, who was elected in the 2019 elections.

See also

Public housing estates in Kwai Chung

References

Residential buildings completed in 1991
Residential buildings completed in 1992
Kwai Chung
Public housing estates in Hong Kong
Tenants Purchase Scheme
1991 establishments in Hong Kong